Valley Centertainment is a leisure and entertainment complex in the Don Valley in Sheffield, South Yorkshire, England. It was built on land previously occupied by steel mills which also includes what is now Meadowhall shopping centre and the Fly DSA Arena. It is home to several restaurants, bars, a cinema, and a bowling alley as well as other attractions.

Attractions

Cinema
The Cineworld cinema is one of the busiest in the UK, with 1.8 million visits a year and has more screens than any other Cineworld multiplex with twenty screens in all. It is also one of the first cinemas to introduce digital screens and introduced an IMAX screen in 2012. As of 2021, the cinema also contains a 4DX screen and Screen X, as well as a Starbucks inside the venue.

Opening on 5 November 1998 as a Virgin Megaplex, it later re-branded in October 1999 to UGC before becoming Cineworld in 2005.

Bowling
The complex features a Hollywood Bowl bowling alley, which has twenty six lanes open until midnight every night. It also contains a bar, cafe and arcade.

Other attractions
Valley Centertainment is also home to an indoor Laser Quest, Laser Quest Sheffield. Consisting of two floors of arena space for the children to explore. Painted brilliantly to look as though the children are in outer space. Paradise Adventure Island Golf opened at the park in February 2012 featuring a large indoor mini adventure golf with 2 different courses. An indoor family entertainment centre called 'Monkey Bizness' opened in 2009, the largest of its kind in the country.

Restaurants
Valley Centertainment has established itself as a popular destination for meals as it contains several restaurants, which at peak times can become very busy. These are:

Burger King
Frankie & Benny's
Five Guys
Chiquito
Nando's
Bella Italia
Wagamama
Proove Pizza
Starbucks
Subway
Pizza Express
39 Desserts
Miller & Carter Steakhouse

Public transport
Valley Centertainment is well served by public transport. It has its own stop on Sheffield Supertram's Yellow and Tram Train routes serving Sheffield City Centre, Meadowhall Interchange, and the nearby town of Rotherham.

It is within easy bus access of both Sheffield and Rotherham city centre.

Road access
Valley Centertainment is easily accessible by road:

From the north - Junction 34 of the M1, and the A6178 or A631.
From the south or east - Junction 33 of the M1, then using the Sheffield Parkway and following the signs for Sheffield Arena from there.
From the west/south west - Travelling to Sheffield City Centre and taking the A6109 (Ring Road Junction 10) from the Inner Ring Road. From there it has been well sign posted.

Parking
Valley Centertainment has its own large, free car park. Parking is safe and secure, rewarded by being given its fifth Park Mark Award.
Despite ample parking, finding a space can be difficult at peak times. Parking is particularly difficult when there is an event taking place at the neighbouring Sheffield Arena, Sheffield Ice Rink, or when nearby Meadowhall Centre is busy. Valley Centertainment operate a strict policy of fining customers if they park in non standard locations.

References

External links
 Valley Leisure

Tourist attractions in Sheffield
Retail parks in the United Kingdom
IMAX venues